
Gmina Budziszewice is a rural gmina (administrative district) in Tomaszów Mazowiecki County, Łódź Voivodeship, in central Poland.

Villages
Gmina Budziszewice contains the villages and settlements of Adamów, Agnopol, Antolin, Budziszewice, Helenów, Mierzno, Nepomucenów, Nowe Mierzno, Nowy Józefów, Nowy Rękawiec, Rękawiec, Stary Józefów, Teodorów, Walentynów, Węgrzynowice, Węgrzynowice-Modrzewie and Zalesie.

Neighbouring gminas
Gmina Budziszewice is bordered by the gminas of Koluszki, Lubochnia, Ujazd and Żelechlinek.

References
Polish official population figures 2006

Budziszewice
Tomaszów Mazowiecki County